The 2016 Abierto de Puebla was a professional tennis tournament played on hard courts. It was the 15th edition of the tournament, but the first since 2009, and was part of the 2016 ATP Challenger Tour and the 2016 ITF Women's Circuit, offering prize money of $100,000+H (ATP) and $25,000 (ITF) on 7–13 March 2016. It took place in Puebla, Mexico.

Singles main-draw entrants

Seeds

1 Rankings as of February 29, 2016.

Other entrants
The following players received wildcards into the singles main draw:
  Lucas Gómez
  Hans Hach Verdugo
  Tigre Hank
  Luis Patiño

The following players received entry as an alternate:
  Robin Stanek

The following players received entry from the qualifying draw:
  Marinko Matosevic
  Andrés Molteni
  Stefano Napolitano
  Agustín Velotti

ITF singles main-draw entrants

Seeds 

 1 Rankings as of 8 February 2016.

Other entrants 
The following players received wildcards into the singles main draw:
  Carolina Betancourt
  Alexia Coutiño Castillo 
  Katia Monserrat de la Garza Valdez
  María José Zacarías

The following players received entry from the qualifying draw:
  Lauren Albanese
  Michaela Hončová
  Ingrid Neel
  Akiko Omae
  Fanny Stollár
  Harmony Tan
  Gabriella Taylor
  Renata Zarazúa

The following player received entry by a lucky loser spot:
  Kateřina Kramperová
  Evgeniya Levashova

Champions

Men's singles 

  Eduardo Struvay def.  Peđa Krstin, 4–6, 6–4, 6–4

Women's singles 
  Irina Khromacheva def.  Richèl Hogenkamp, 6–3, 6–2

Men's doubles 

  Marcus Daniell /  Artem Sitak def.  Santiago González /  Mate Pavić, 3–6, 6–2, [12–10]

Women's doubles
  Akiko Omae /  Prarthana Thombare def.  Irina Khromacheva /  Ksenia Lykina, 6–4, 2–6 [10–8]

External links
Combined Main Draw
 2016 Abierto de Puebla at ITFtennis.com

Abierto de Puebla
2016 ITF Women's Circuit
Challenger Britania Zavaleta
Mex